Onimaru may refer to:

Onimaru, a character in the 1988 film Wuthering Heights
, Japanese lawyer and judge

Japanese-language surnames